Sorkh Lijeh or Sarkhalijeh or Sorkh Alijeh or Sorkhelijeh may refer to:
 Sorkh Lijeh, Hamadan
 Sorkh Alijeh, Kermanshah